The following radio stations broadcast on FM frequency 94.6 MHz:

China 
 Beijing Music Radio in Beijing (cabel FM)
 CNR The Voice of China in Luoyang

Indonesia
 Style Radio in Tasikmalaya

Malaysia
 Lite in Johor Bahru, Johor and Singapore

New Zealand
 Coast in Wanaka

Nigeria
 Brc 2 FM in Bauchi

United Kingdom
 Cabin FM in Herne Bay
 BBC Radio Stoke in Stoke-On-Trent

References

Lists of radio stations by frequency